Dale Township is the name of several townships in the United States:

 Dale Township, McLean County, Illinois
 Dale Township, O'Brien County, Iowa
 Dale Township, Kingman County, Kansas
 Dale Township, Cottonwood County, Minnesota
 Dale Township, Atchison County, Missouri

Township name disambiguation pages